Dance Along with Basie is an album released by pianist, composer and bandleader Count Basie featuring tracks recorded in late 1959 and originally released on the Roulette label.

Reception

The album won the Best Performance by a Band for Dancing at the 3rd Annual Grammy Awards. AllMusic awarded the album 3 stars.

Track listing
 "It Had to Be You" (Isham Jones, Gus Kahn) - 2:56
 "Makin' Whoopee" (Walter Donaldson, Kahn) - 4:00
 "Can't We Be Friends" (Paul James, Kay Swift) - 5:22
 "Misty" (Erroll Garner) - 3:35
 "It's a Pity to Say Goodnight" (Billy Reid) - 3:37
 "How Am I to Know" (Jack King, Dorothy Parker) - 2:26
 "Easy Living" (Ralph Rainger, Leo Robin) - 3:35
 "Fools Rush In" (Rube Bloom, Johnny Mercer) - 3:10
 "Secret Love" (Sammy Fain, Mercer) - 3:17
 "Give Me the Simple Life" (Bloom, Harry Ruby) - 3:32

Personnel 
Count Basie - piano
John Anderson, Thad Jones, Joe Newman, Snooky Young - trumpet
Henry Coker, Al Grey, Benny Powell - trombone
Marshal Royal - alto saxophone, clarinet
Frank Wess - alto saxophone, tenor saxophone, flute
Frank Foster, Billy Mitchell - tenor saxophone
Charlie Fowlkes - baritone saxophone
Freddie Green - guitar
Eddie Jones - bass
Sonny Payne - drums

References 

1959 albums
Count Basie Orchestra albums
Roulette Records albums
Albums produced by Teddy Reig
Grammy Award for Best Performance by an Orchestra – for Dancing